Paul Henry (b. Aberystwyth, 1959) is a Welsh poet, songwriter and broadcaster. His poetry collection Boy Running was shortlisted for the Wales Book of the Year award in 2016.

Biography
Starting out as a singer-songwriter, Henry's first collection Time Pieces was published by Seren Press in 1991, winning a Gregory Award. In 1992, he attended Joseph Brodsky's poetry masterclass at the Hay Festival, since which time a further eight books have appeared. His poems have been widely anthologised and can be found in journals such as Poetry Review and The Times Literary Supplement. They have also featured on BBC Radio 4's Poetry Please.

The Brittle Sea, New & Selected Poems was recently reprinted by Seren in the UK and by Dronequill in India, under the title The Black Guitar. Mari d’Ingrid, Gerard Augustin's translation of his fifth collection, Ingrid’s Husband, is published by L’Harmattan. He was described by the late U. A. Fanthorpe as "a poet's poet who combines a sense of the music of words with an endlessly inventive imagination".

Henry teaches creative writing at writers' centres and has lectured at the University of South Wales. He has read and performed his songs at venues across Europe, the USA and India. His co-readers have included Paul Muldoon, Carol Ann Duffy, Don Paterson and Vikram Seth.  Henry is a featured poet in the UK pages of Poetry International and in the British Council authors' pages. More recently, he has written and presented arts programmes for BBC Radio 3 and Radio 4.

Works
Poetry:
 2011: The Black Guitar - Selected Poems, Dronequill (India)
 2010: The Brittle Sea: New & Selected Poems, Seren
 2008: Mari d'Ingrid, L'Harmattan (tr. Gerard Augustin)
 2007: Ingrid’s Husband, Seren
 2004: The Breath of Sleeping Boys & other poems, Carreg Gwalch
 2002: The Slipped Leash, Seren
 1998: The Milk Thief, Seren
 1996: Captive Audience, Seren
 1991: Time Pieces, Seren

References

External links
Personal site

1959 births
People from Aberystwyth
Academics of the University of Glamorgan
Living people
21st-century Welsh poets
21st-century British male writers
21st-century Welsh writers